Colobothea juncea is a species of beetle in the family Cerambycidae. It was described by Bates in 1865. It is known from Brazil and French Guinea.

References

juncea
Beetles described in 1865